The 2014–15 Colorado Buffaloes women's basketball team will represent University of Colorado Boulder during the 2014–15 NCAA Division I women's basketball season. The Buffaloes, led by fifth year head coach Linda Lappe, play their home games at the Coors Events Center and were a members of the Pac-12 Conference. They finished the season 15–17, 6–12 in Pac-12 play to finish in a tie for ninth place. They advanced to the semifinals of the Pac-12 women's tournament where they lost to California.

Roster

Schedule

|-
!colspan=9 style="background:#000000; color:#CEBE70;"| Exhibition

|-
!colspan=9 style="background:#000000; color:#CEBE70;"| Regular Season

|-
!colspan=9 style="background:#000000;"|  Pac-12 Conference Women's Tournament

See also
2014–15 Colorado Buffaloes men's basketball team

References

Colorado Buffaloes women's basketball seasons
Colorado Buff
Colorado Buff
2014–15 Pac-12 Conference women's basketball season